Julie Rossignol (born 23 July 1997 in Saint Germain en Laye) is a French professional squash player. As of February 2018, she was ranked number 116 in the world.

References

1997 births
Living people
French female squash players